was a Japanese sculptor. His work was part of the sculpture event in the art competition at the 1932 Summer Olympics.

References

1882 births
1958 deaths
20th-century Japanese sculptors
Japanese sculptors
Olympic competitors in art competitions
People from Tokyo